Mahmudul Amin Choudhury (18 June 1937 – 22 December 2019) was a Bangladeshi jurist who served as the 11th Chief Justice of Bangladesh. He was the judge on the Shazneen Tasnim Rahman murder trial. He died on 22 December 2019 at the age of 82.

References

1937 births
2019 deaths
People from Sylhet
Supreme Court of Bangladesh justices
Chief justices of Bangladesh